The Sydney Women's Film Group (SWFG) was a collective group of women members of the Sydney Filmmakers' Cooperative (SFMC) whose interest was in distributing and exhibiting films by, for and about women. From the beginning a group with feminist intentions and outlook, it was contemporaneous with, and part of, the Women's Liberation Movement in Sydney in the 1970s.  In 1978 Feminist Film Workers, a smaller closed group of SWFG members was formed in response to "the growing apolitical and amorphous quality of the SWFG", continuing distribution and exhibition work and making more explicit the group's feminist intentions and outlook.

History 
The Sydney Women's Film Group first appeared in the production credits of three films made in the early 1970s, Film for Discussion (1974), Woman's Day 20Cents (1973) and Home (1973), as part of the burgeoning Women's Liberation Movement. The name was then adopted for the distribution and exhibition group that was formed in 1973 within the Sydney Filmmakers Co-op. Sydney Women's Film Group and Feminist Filmworkers effectively ceased to exist once the Co-op's cinema closed in 1981 when the Australian Film Commission decided to no longer subsidise the cinema's operation.

The early films 
The personnel involved in the production of Film for Discussion, Woman's Day 20Cents and Home made the decision that no individual credits would appear on any of the three films. This was influenced by the wide-reaching and radical women's liberation critique of  individualistic and hierarchical practices which were regarded as contributing to "famous men" notions of history. The production entity was therefore named as the Sydney Women's Film Group for these three films.

Activities 
Although the name originated to describe a production entity, subsequently the activities of the group centred on distribution, exhibition, workshops and discussions, and political lobbying.

Membership 
Though there were no formal membership requirements, most women who were active in the group had films in distribution with the Sydney Filmmakers Co-op, particularly after the productive Women's Film Workshop of 1974.

Workshops and influence 
The Womenvision weekend, held at the Sydney Filmmakers Co-operative In November 1973, was billed as "a weekend for women involved in the media, but more importantly it's a weekend for women interested in finding out about being women". Attended by over 200 women, the weekend program viewed and discussed the stereotypical roles historically written for women in fiction films, the difficulty of finding work as an actress if you were not prepared to play these roles, and the male domination of the film and television industries in both creative and technical roles.  The first practical result of Womenvision was successfully lobbying the newly created Australian Film and Television School for funding for an independently run Women's Film Workshop (1974). the aim of which was to teach the basics of scriptwriting, filming, sound recording, and editing by the production of short 16mm films. Several participants in the workshop subsequently went on to careers in various aspects of the developing Australian film and television industries, and to foundational teaching roles in newly created media courses within tertiary institutions.  

Subsequent SWFG lobbying resulted in a course in held at the Australian Film and Television School in 1977, which provided participants with the opportunity to learn basic television studio production processes.

Of the less tangible influence of the work undertaken by the SWFG, film and television producer Jan Chapman had this to say on reflection in 2002: Without the influence and political lobbying of these women I don't believe I would have had the subconscious conviction ... that I could make films, and that what I wanted to say, even if intimate, domestic and personal in scale, was just as interesting as the mythic male legends.

References 

Organisations based in Sydney
Australian artist groups and collectives
Film organisations in Australia
1970s establishments in Australia
Film collectives